Sir Richard Marsh Crofton  (6 April 1891 – 27 May 1955) was an Indian Civil Service and British Indian Army officer who served as 1st Prime Minister of Bahawalpur between 1942 and 1947. He was knighted in the 1945 Birthday Honours.

He died in 1955.

References

1891 births
1955 deaths
People from Liskeard
Prime Ministers of Bahawalpur (princely state)
Companions of the Order of the Indian Empire
Indian Civil Service (British India) officers
British Indian Army officers
Knights Bachelor
British people in colonial India